The 2014 Caoxijiu Suzhou Ladies Open was a professional tennis tournament played on hard courts. It was the second edition of the tournament which was part of the 2014 WTA 125K series. It took place in Suzhou, China, on 1–6 September 2014.

Singles draw entrants

Seeds 

 1 Rankings as of 25 August 2014.

Other entrants 
The following players received wildcards into the singles main draw:
  Li Yixuan 
  Liu Fangzhou
  Yang Zhaoxuan
  Zheng Saisai

There was no qualifying draw due to insufficient number of players

Withdrawals
Before the tournament
  Petra Cetkovská [replaced by Nadiia Kichenok]
  Misaki Doi [replaced by Nigina Abduraimova]
  Vesna Dolonc [replaced by Kateryna Kozlova]
  Alexandra Dulgheru [replaced by Duan Yingying]
  Jarmila Gajdošová [replaced by Sofia Shapatava]
  Julia Glushko [replaced by Magda Linette]
  Aleksandra Krunić [replaced by Risa Ozaki]
  Alla Kudryavtseva [replaced by Petra Martić]
  Pauline Parmentier [replaced by Eri Hozumi]
  Katarzyna Piter [replaced by Elitsa Kostova]
  Kristýna Plíšková [replaced by Arina Rodionova]
  Lesia Tsurenko [replaced by Su-Wei Hsieh]
  Alison Van Uytvanck [replaced by Misa Eguchi]
  Yanina Wickmayer [replaced by Lyudmyla Kichenok]

Doubles draw entrants

Seeds

Champions

Singles 

  Anna-Lena Friedsam def.  Duan Yingying 6–1, 6–3

Doubles 

  Chan Chin-wei /  Chuang Chia-jung def.  Misa Eguchi /  Eri Hozumi 6–1, 3–6, [10–7]

External links 
 2014 Suzhou Ladies Open at wtatennis.com

References

2014 WTA 125K series
2014
2014 in Chinese tennis